Hot or Not, currently rebranded as Chat & Date, is a rating site that allowed users to rate the attractiveness of photos submitted voluntarily by others.  The site offered a matchmaking engine called 'Meet Me' and an extended profile feature called "Hotlists". The domain hotornot.com is currently owned by Hot Or Not Limited, and was previously owned by Avid Life Media. 'Hot or Not' was a significant influence on the people who went on to create the social media sites Facebook and YouTube.

Description
Users would submit photographs of themselves to the site for the purpose of other users to rate said person's attractiveness on a scale of 1 - 10, with the cumulative average acting as the overall score for a given photograph.

History
The site was founded in October 2000 by James Hong and Jim Young, two friends and Silicon Valley-based engineers. Both graduated from the University of California, Berkeley in electrical engineering, with Young pursuing a Ph.D at the time. It was inspired by some other developers' ideas.

The site was a technical solution to a disagreement the founders had one day over a passing woman's attractiveness. The site was originally called "Am I Hot or Not". Within a week of launching, it had reached almost two million page views per day. Within a few months, the site was immediately behind CNET and NBCi on NetNielsen Rating's Top 25 advertising domains. To keep up with rising costs Hong and Young added a matchmaking component to their website called "Meet Me at Hot or Not", i.e. a system of range voting.  The matchmaking service has been especially successful and the site continues to generate most of its revenue through subscriptions. In the December 2006 issue of Time magazine, the founders of YouTube stated that they originally set out to make a version of Hot or Not with Video before developing their more inclusive site. Mark Zuckerberg of Facebook similarly got his start by creating a Hot or Not type site called FaceMash, where he posted photos from Harvard's Facebook for the university's community to rate.

Hot or Not was sold for a rumored $20 million on February 8, 2008, to Avid Life Media, owners of Ashley Madison. Annual revenue reached $7.5 million, with net profits of $5.5 million. They initially started off $60,000 in debt due to tuition fees James paid for his MBA. On July 31, 2008, Hot or Not launched Hot or Not Gossip and a Baresi rate box (a "hot meter") – a subdivision to expand their market, run by former radio DJ turned celebrity blogger Zack Taylor.

In 2012, Hot or Not was purchased by Badoo, which is owned by Bumble Inc. The app is currently rebranded as Chat & Date which uses a similar user interface to Badoo and shares user accounts between both sites.

Predecessors and spin-offs

Hot or Not was preceded by other rating sites, like RateMyFace, which was registered a year earlier in the summer of 1999, and AmIHot.com, which was registered in January 2000 by MIT freshman Daniel Roy. Regardless, despite any head starts of its predecessors, Hot or Not quickly became the most popular. Since AmIHotOrNot.com's launch, the concept has spawned many imitators. The concept always remained the same, but the subject matter varied greatly. The concept has also been integrated with a wide variety of dating and matchmaking systems. In 2007 BecauseImHot.com launched and deleted anyone with a rating below 7 after a voting audit or the first 50 votes (whichever is first).

Research
In 2005, as an example of using image morphing methods to study the effects of averageness, imaging researcher Pierre Tourigny created a composite of about 30 faces to find out the current standard of good looks on the Internet. On the Hot or Not web site, people rate others' attractiveness on a scale of 1 to 10. An average score based on hundreds or even thousands of individual ratings takes only a few days to emerge. To make this hot or not palette of morphed images, photos from the site were sorted by rank and used SquirlzMorph to create multi-morph composites from them. Unlike projects like Face of Tomorrow, where the subjects are posed for the purpose, the portraits are blurry because the source images are of low resolution with differences in variables such as posture, hair styles and glasses, so that in this instance images could use only 36 control points for the morphs.  A similar study was done with Miss Universe contestants, as shown in the averageness article, as well as one for age, as shown in youthfulness article.

A 2006 "hot" or "not" style study, involving 264 women and 18 men, at the Washington University School of Medicine, as published online in the journal Brain Research, indicates that a person's brain determines whether an image is erotically appealing long before the viewer is even aware they are seeing the picture. Moreover, according to these researchers, one of the basic functions of the brain is to classify images into a hot or not type categorization. The study's researchers also discovered that sexy shots induce a uniquely powerful reaction in the brain, equal in effect for both men and women, and that erotic images produced a strong reaction in the hypothalamus.

See also
Tinder
Badoo
 Photofeeler

Notes

References

External links
The Hotornot website

Canadian entertainment websites
Internet properties established in 2000
Review websites